Ville Lehtinen (born 17 December 1978) is a Finnish former footballer.

As a junior Lehtinen played for Jyväskylän Jalkapalloklubi. He made his first-team debut in Finland's top division Veikkausliiga for Helsingin Jalkapalloklubi in 1997. He played only two games before moving to Sheffield United. He played only in youth and reserve team matches for Sheffield United .

In December 1998 Lehtinen returned to Finland and practised with FC Inter Turku. Inter and Lehtinen had some controversy regarding the contract between them. Inter claimed that Lehtinen was only for trial in the team, but Lehtinen claimed he had signed a one-year contract with Inter. Inter won the court battle, and in 1999 Lehtinen played for FC Jazz from Pori. In 2000, he played with Pallo-Iirot from Rauma.

In 2001 Lehtinen joined Tampere United. He made seven goals and won the Finnish championship. During the season 2002 he moved to Norwegian F.K. Bodø/Glimt. He spent three years in Norway before returning to Finland and AC Allianssi. With Allianssi he won the Finnish League Cup in 2005. After Allianssi was drifted to match fixing scandal, Lehtinen returned to Tampere United during the season. In 2006, he was the best goalscorer for the team and again won the Finnish championship. After the season, he traveled to England doing trials for many clubs like Leeds United and also tried to sign contract with FC Honka from Espoo. However no contract was made and Lehtinen decided to end his football career and concentrate on his job as an investment manager. In July 2007 Lehtinen decided come back to football fields. He played two games in Atlantis FC in Ykkönen (the second tier) before the contract with Veikkausliiga team AC Oulu was announced.

He is also a musician and his first single Naapurintyttö was released in 2006. Many Finnish radio stations have played his music.

External links
 Official homepage of Ville Lehtinen
 AC Oulu profile

1978 births
Living people
Finnish footballers
Association football forwards
JJK Jyväskylä players
Sheffield United F.C. players
FC Jazz players
Helsingin Jalkapalloklubi players
Tampere United players
Atlantis FC players
AC Oulu players
Veikkausliiga players
Eliteserien players
Expatriate footballers in England
Expatriate footballers in Norway
Finnish expatriate footballers
FK Bodø/Glimt players
Sportspeople from Pirkanmaa